The Ragged Heiress is a 1922 American silent drama film directed by Harry Beaumont and starring Shirley Mason, John Harron and Edwin Stevens.

Cast
 Shirley Mason as Lucia Moreton
 John Harron as Glen Wharton
 Edwin Stevens as Sam Moreton
 Cecil Van Auker as James Moreton
 Claire McDowell as Sylvia Moreton
 Aggie Herring as Nora Burke
 Eileen O'Malley as Lucia, age 3

References

Bibliography
James Robert Parish & Michael R. Pitts. Film directors: a guide to their American films. Scarecrow Press, 1974.

External links
 

1922 films
1922 drama films
1920s English-language films
American silent feature films
Silent American drama films
American black-and-white films
Films directed by Harry Beaumont
Fox Film films
1920s American films